Vanja Radovanović (born 28 October 1982) is a Montenegrin singer and songwriter. He represented Montenegro in the Eurovision Song Contest 2018 in Lisbon, Portugal, with the song "Inje", however failed to make the final, coming 16th place in Semi-final 2.

Personal life
He is the nephew of former singer Miladin Šobić.

References

External links 

1982 births
Eurovision Song Contest entrants of 2018
Living people
Eurovision Song Contest entrants for Montenegro
21st-century Montenegrin male singers
Montenegrin songwriters
Musicians from Belgrade
Musicians from Nikšić
Beovizija contestants